Ilex gardneriana is a critically endangered species of plant in the family Aquifoliaceae. It is endemic to the Nilgiri Hills of India.

References

External links
 Specimen at Kew Gardens.

gardneriana
Endemic flora of India (region)
Taxonomy articles created by Polbot

Critically endangered flora of Asia